The 1992 All-Ireland Under-21 Football Championship was the 29th staging of the All-Ireland Under-21 Football Championship since its establishment by the Gaelic Athletic Association in 1964.

Tyrone entered the championship as defending champions.

On 30 August 1992, Tyrone won the championship following a 1-10 to 1-7 defeat of Galway in the All-Ireland final. This was their second All-Ireland title overall and their second title in successive seasons.

Results

All-Ireland Under-21 Football Championship

Semi-finals

Final

Statistics

Miscellaneous

 Peter Canavan of Tyrone becomes the first player to captain a team to successive All-Ireland titles.

References

1992
All-Ireland Under-21 Football Championship